CSSI Technologies, Inc., formerly Computer Support Services, Inc., is a multi-national company providing technology solutions and professional services. The company is best known for releasing Core Integrator Workflow, a Workflow/Business Process Management (BPM) technology suite.

Computer Support Services, Inc. (CSSI) is a Microsoft Silver Certified Partner and a re-seller of Microsoft Dynamics GP, formerly known as Great Plains, a Platinum Partner of Intermec and a Gold Partner of Motorola Solutions providing supply chain solutions. CSSI headquarters is located in Lewisburg, Pennsylvania, along with offices in Pittsburgh and Wyomissing.  CSSI is the parent company of CSSI Global Technologies located in Bangalore, India. In 2007, Inc. 5000 awards recognized CSSI as one of the top 5,000 fastest growing companies in the United States.

History
The company was founded in 1973 as Computer Support Services by Ronald P. Lewis to provide companies with data processing services. Computer Support Services, also known as RPL & Co. at that time, was incorporated in 1978. In 1980, the company established itself as a service-oriented company under new owners, Delmar R. Ritter and David L. Cornelius. With sales reaching $2.4 million, the company added a third owner, Thomas A. Erickson, in 1989.

In 1992, employee Terrance (Terry) Early joined others in a U.S. delegation of People to People Citizens Ambassador Program to visit the former Soviet Union.  Meeting with government and business leaders related to business operations in a free enterprise system.  The company acquired Quality Data Products of Williamsport, Pennsylvania from David Franklin in 1993.

In 1997, CSSI became a reseller of Great Plains Software and, as of 2012, continues as a Microsoft Silver Certified Partner and a reseller of Microsoft Dynamics GP. In 2011, the company opened a subsidiary, CSSI Global Technologies, to sell the company's flagship product, Core Integrator, worldwide.

In 2018, the company announced the change of the company's name to CSSI Technologies, and the divestment of its Core Integrator software business, which would be independently operated as CoreIntegrator, LLC.

In 2019, CSSI Technologies was recognized by Zebra Technologies for successfully implementing warehouse management software and Android mobile devices at North Central Sight Services.

In 2020, CSSI Technologies introduced CSSI Device Life cycle Management™, a subscription service through which CSSI manages the provisioning and OS version maintenance of customer Android mobile computers. The company also announced the receipt of a federal contract from the U.S. Office of Personnel Management for bar code-generating software.

Current executives
 David Cornelius, CEO
 Joe Tosolt, President

References

American companies established in 1973
Companies based in Union County, Pennsylvania
Technology companies of the United States
1973 establishments in Pennsylvania